Arucas Club de Fútbol, is a Spanish football team based in Arucas, Las Palmas, Gran Canaria in the Canary Islands. Founded in 1927, it plays in Tercera División RFEF – Group 12, holding home games at Complejo Antonio Afonso Moreno, commonly known as Tonono, with a capacity of 1,000 people.

Club history

Club names

Argentino Fútbol Club (1927–1941)
Argentino Club Deportivo (1941–1951)
Arucas Club de Fútbol (1951– )

Season to season

9 seasons in Tercera División
1 season in Tercera División RFEF

References

External links
Soccerway team profile

Football clubs in the Canary Islands
Association football clubs established in 1927
1927 establishments in Spain